Max Wertheimer (April 15, 1880 – October 12, 1943) was a Czech-born psychologist who was one of the three founders of Gestalt psychology, along with Kurt Koffka and Wolfgang Köhler. He is known for his book, Productive Thinking, and for conceiving the phi phenomenon as part of his work in Gestalt psychology.

Wertheimer became interested in psychology and studied under Carl Stumpf at the University of Berlin. Wertheimer then went on to obtain his PhD in 1904 under Oswald Külpe, at the University of Würzburg and then began his intellectual career teaching at the Institute for Social Research at Frankfurt University. For a short time, he left Frankfurt to work at the Berlin Psychological Institute, but returned in 1929 as a full professor. Wertheimer eventually joined the faculty of The New School in New York, a position he held until his death.

Early life
Max Wertheimer was born on April 15, 1880, in Prague, then part of the Bohemian Austria-Hungary. He was born to Wilhelm and Rosa Wertheimer, second to his brother Walter. Wilhelm Wertheimer was an educator and financier. Rosa Wilhelm, born Rosa Zwicker, had a rich classical education. The Wertheimers were active in the Jewish community in which they lived. The Wertheimer household was extremely intellectual, therefore Max received education from both his parents; he engaged in political and educational discussions at home, as well as taking piano and violin lessons. After he received one of Baruch Spinoza's books as a gift, he developed an interest in philosophy. He felt that he and Spinoza shared a culture and common traits.

Wertheimer began his formal education aged five, at a private elementary school maintained by the Piarist order of the Roman Catholic Church. It was not uncommon at this time for Jewish children in central Europe to receive educations from the Catholic Church. Aged ten, he graduated from the Piarist Grammar School and enrolled in the Royal Imperial New City German State High School, where he could expect to obtain a degree that would qualify him for admittance to a university. Due to the diverse courses offered by the university, he began to contemplate his future, and realized his deep fascination with philosophy. He first began to study law at Charles University, where he also explored philosophy, and other fields such as music, physiology, and psychology. After a year, Max left and enrolled in University of Berlin where he shifted his study to philosophy. At Berlin, Max was able to work in the company of figures such as Carl Stumpf, Friederich Schumann, Georg Elias Müller, and Erich von Hornbostel. Later on, in 1903, he gained his PhD from the University of Würzburg. There he completed research on the lie detector.

Later life

Max Wertheimer began his academic career at an institute in Frankfurt, later to become the University of Frankfurt. Max left Frankfurt from 1916 to 1929 to pursue a job at the Berlin Psychological Institute but returned to Frankfurt in 1929 as a full professor, where he stayed until 1933. In 1923, while teaching in Berlin, Wertheimer married Anna Caro (called Anni), a physician's daughter, with whom he had four children: Rudolf (who died in infancy, 1924), Valentin (1925–1978), Michael (1927–2022) and Lise (born 1928, Lisbeth Rosa). Max and Anna Wertheimer divorced in 1942.

Wertheimer was a captain in the army during World War I. After coming back from the war he gave lectures and pursued his research on perception and gestalt in the University of Berlin until 1933. But in 1933, the change in Germany's government convinced Wertheimer to leave Germany; he heard Adolf Hitler's declarations and he felt his Jewish roots placed him in danger. The Wertheimer family joined other German emigres and moved to the United States. The Wertheimers' emigration was arranged through the U.S. consulate in Prague, and he and his wife and their children arrived in New York harbor on September 13, 1933. The family became citizens as well; that's why Max Wertheimer is referred to as a German-American psychologist.

Along with his move to America, Wertheimer accepted a professional position at age fifty-three at the New School for Social Research in New York City. The New School had been founded only fourteen-years before when he gained the opportunity to teach courses there, remaining at the New School for the last decade of his life. He remained in touch with his European colleagues, many of whom had also emigrated to America. Koffka was teaching at Smith College; Köhler at Swarthmore College; and Lewin at Cornell University and the University of Iowa. Although in declining health, Wertheimer continued to work on his research of problem-solving, what he preferred to call "productive thinking." He completed his only book, Productive Thinking on the subject in late September 1943. He died from a heart attack just three weeks after the book's completion at his home in New Rochelle, New York. Wertheimer is interred in Beechwoods Cemetery, also in New Rochelle. He was the father of Michael Wertheimer, also a psychologist.

Phi phenomenon
Max Wertheimer began the formal founding of Gestalt psychology in 1910 as he began experiments on the phi phenomenon. He published these experiments in a paper titled "Experimental Studies on the Perception of Movement". The phi phenomenon is apparent movement caused by alternating light positions. Wertheimer illustrated this phenomenon on an apparatus he built that utilized two discrete lights on different locations. Although the lights are stationary, flashing the lights at succeeding time intervals causes the retina to perceive the light as moving. Wertheimer worked with partners Koffka and Köhler to collect data which ultimately led to their launch of the Gestalt movement. Their findings further demonstrated that the quality of the whole is different from the sum of the parts. The explanation of the phi phenomena was that movement is perceived because the eye itself moves in response to the successive flashes of light. The movement an observer experiences is based on feedback from the moving eye. The researchers maintained that human perception is prone to such illusions and they speculated that it is more meaningful to connect close-together events than to keep them artificially separate.

Productive thinking
As a Gestalt theorist, Max Wertheimer was interested in perception, but additionally interested in thought. These ideas formed the basis of his posthumously published book, Productive Thinking (1945). Wertheimer was interested in making a distinction between reproductive thinking and productive thinking. Reproductive thinking is associated with repetition, conditioning, habits or familiar intellectual territory. Productive thinking is the product of new ideas and breakthroughs. Productive thinking is insight-based reasoning. Wertheimer argued that only insightful reasoning could bring true understanding of conceptual problems and relationships. Wertheimer encouraged training in traditional logic.  He believed traditional logic stimulated thinking. However, he believed that logic alone did not give rise to productive thinking. He believed creativity was also crucial to engage in positive thinking. In Productive Thinking, similar to his lectures, Wertheimer used concrete examples to illustrate his principles. Wertheimer used these illustrations to demonstrate the transition from S1, a state where nothing really seems to make sense, to S2, where everything seems clear and the concept grasped. He points out in "Productive Thinking" that solving a problem by blind obedience to rules prevents real understanding of the problems. He believes that this blind obedience forestalls a person from uncovering the solution. Max Wertheimer's ideas of productive thinking are of continuing relevance in modern ideas of schemas, plans, and knowledge structures today.

Gestalt theory

Wertheimer developed his Gestalt theory in 1910 while he was on board a train from Vienna for a vacation in Germany's Rhineland. Gestalt, in the closest English definition of the term, is translated potentially as configuration, form, holistic, structure, and pattern. According to Gestalt psychology, perception is a whole. In this sense, perception can shape vision and the other senses. In addition, the theory also maintained that the whole is not only greater than its components but also different from those components. By 1920, Wertheimer added the position that the properties of any parts are governed by the structural laws of the whole. Later efforts to discover such laws had limited success. Wertheimer's work on gestalt psychology with his colleagues at The New School was seen as an opposition and alternative to the behavioral approach to psychology.

Wertheimer started the cognitive school of psychology. His ideas also challenged structuralism and atomism, in that he and other gestalt psychologists were more concerned about the whole rather than small structures or fragments of an object.

Publications
 
 Wertheimer, M. (1922). Untersuchungen zur Lehre von der Gestalt, I: Prinzipielle Bemerkungen [Investigations in Gestalt theory: I. The general theoretical situation]. Psychologische Forschung, 1, 47–58.
 Wertheimer, M. (1923). Untersuchungen zur Lehre von der Gestalt, II. [Investigations in Gestalt Theory: II. Laws of organization in perceptual forms]. Psychologische Forschung, 4, 301–350.
 Wertheimer, M. (1938a). The general theoretical situation. In W. D. Ellis (Ed.), A source book of Gestalt psychology (pp. 12–16). London, England: Routledge & Kegan Paul. (Original work published 1922)
 Wertheimer, M. (1938b). Gestalt theory. In W. D. Ellis (Ed.), A source book of Gestalt psychology (pp. 1–11). London, England: Routledge & Kegan Paul. (Original work published 1924)
 Wertheimer, M. (1938c). Laws of organization in perceptual forms. In W. D. Ellis (Ed.), A source book of Gestalt psychology (pp. 71–94). London, England: Routledge & Kegan Paul. (Original work published 1923)
 Wertheimer, M. (1945). Productive thinking. New York, NY: Harper.

See also
Berlin School of experimental psychology
Nicola Cuomo

References

Sources
 Michael Wertheimer, A Brief History of Psychology. 4th edition. Fort Worth TX: Harcourt Brace, 2000.
 American Psychological Association. Portraits of Pioneers in Psychology. New York: APA and Ehrlbaum, 2000.
 D. Brett King and Michael Wertheimer, Max Wertheimer and Gestalt Theory. New Brunswick NJ: Transaction Publishers, 2005.
Sills, D. L., & Merton, R. K. (1968). Max Wertheimer. International encyclopedia of the social sciences (pp. 522–527). New York: Macmillan.
Cherry, K. (n.d.). Max Wertheimer Biography. Psychology – Complete Guide to Psychology for Students, Educators & Enthusiasts. Retrieved February 25, 2012
Cherry, K. (n.d.). Perceptual Organization – Gestalt Laws of Perceptual Organization. Psychology – Complete Guide to Psychology for Students, Educators & Enthusiasts. Retrieved February 25, 2012
Hothersall, D. (2003). History of Psychology. New York: McGraw-Hill.

External links

 International Society for Gestalt Theory and its Applications - GTA
 Short biographical articles on Wertheimer, et al.
 Art, Design and Gestalt Theory 
 On Max Wertheimer and Pablo Picasso
  On Being Wertheimer's Student

1880 births
1943 deaths
Charles University alumni
Gestalt psychologists
Czech Jews
Jewish emigrants from Nazi Germany to the United States
Scientists from New Rochelle, New York
People from Prague in health professions
The New School faculty
People with acquired American citizenship